The Old Enon Road Stone Arch Culvert is a historic limestone bridge in southern Clark County, Ohio, United States. It carries Rocky Point Road over Mud Run, a tributary of the Mad River, just west of its intersection with Old Mill Road. In the past, the region was dotten with stone culverts, which were built in the nineteenth and early twentieth centuries to carry roads over small watercourses. Today, few stone culverts survive in Ohio; the Old Enon Road culvert is both Clark County's only such bridge in daily use and the oldest bridge of any type still open to daily traffic throughout the county.

In 2009, the culvert was listed on the National Register of Historic Places.  It qualified because of its distinctive engineering, which was seen as representing a significant and well-preserved aspect of local historic architecture.

References

External links

Bridges completed in 1871
Buildings and structures in Clark County, Ohio
National Register of Historic Places in Clark County, Ohio
Limestone buildings in the United States
Road bridges on the National Register of Historic Places in Ohio
Transportation in Clark County, Ohio
Stone arch bridges in the United States